The Ivory Pinnacles are a pair of ice-covered peaks rising to  on the west side of Pettus Glacier,  southeast of Cape Kjellman, in northern Graham Land, Antarctica. The Ivory Pinnacles are separated from nearby Poynter Hill by the 700-metre pass Poynter Col. Other nearby peaks include Mount Bradley, Mount Reece, Mount Roberts, Tinsel Dome, Webster Peaks, and Wimple Dome.
The feature was surveyed by Falkland Islands Dependencies Survey from "Hope Bay" and charted in July 1948 by members of the Falkland Islands Dependencies Survey who applied the descriptive name
, photographed from the air by FIDASE, 1956–57.

References

External links
Ivory Pinnacles at Mapcarta — Interactive map

Davis Coast
Mountains of Graham Land